Shan State Hluttaw is the legislature of Shan State in Burma, established on February 8, 2016. It is a unicameral body, consisting of 137 members—103 elected members and 34 military representatives. As of February 2016, Sai Long Hseng of the Union Solidarity and Development Party (USDP) leads the Hluttaw.

General Election results (Nov 2010)

General Election results (Nov 2015)
After the 2015 general election, the Burmese Military held on to a narrow majority of seats in the legislature. This is currently the only legislature in which the National League for Democracy (NLD) had not won the majority of seats in this election. There were 14 vacant seats that were not contested due to insurgency.

See also
State and Region Hluttaws
Pyidaungsu Hluttaw

References

Legislatures of Burmese states and regions
Shan State
Unicameral legislatures